Amy Fawsitt (1836 – December 26, 1876) also known as Mrs. Menzies, was an English actress.

In 1867, Miss Fawsitt made her first appearance on the London stage at the old Standard Theatre,  Globe Theatre, Vaudeville Theatre. At this period she was looked upon as a promising rival of Marie Wilton.

Fawsitt died of tuberculosis on December 26, 1876, in New York.  She had made her American debut in September 1876 in Life at the Fifth Avenue Theatre, and withdrew on October 10.

References

External links

portrait Amy Fawsitt(archived)

1836 births
1876 deaths
English stage actresses
Actresses from London
19th-century English actresses
19th-century English singers